Orange Mound, a neighborhood in southeast Memphis, Tennessee, was the first neighborhood in America to be built by and for African Americans.

Built on the grounds of the former Deaderick plantation, the Orange Mound subdivision was developed for African Americans in the 1890s to provide affordable land and residences for the less wealthy.

Drugs and crime infected the neighborhood in the 1980s and 1990s. In the first decade of the 21st century, revitalization efforts were started and show positive effects.

Geography 
Orange Mound is bounded by Semmes St. to the east, (bordering University Districts) and by Lamar and Kimball Avenues to the south. The Southern Avenue & IC Railroad tracks that cross in front of the Mid-South Coliseum form the northern & western borders while separating it from the Belt Line and Midtown.
The streets outlining the plantation that originally existed on that ground were Goodwyn St on the east, Park Ave on the south and Airways at the southwest.

Demographics 
The neighborhood has a population of approximately 14,400 of which 95 percent are of African-American heritage.

History

Deaderick plantation - 1800s 
Orange Mound stands on the site of the former John Deaderick plantation. Between 1825 and 1830, Deaderick (whose family donated the land in Nashville on which the Tennessee State Capitol was built) purchased 5,000 acres (20 km²) of land (from Airways to Semmes) and built a stately house there (at what is now the east side of Airways, between Carnes and Spottswood). In 1890, a developer named Elzey Eugene Meachem purchased land from the Deaderick family and began developing a subdivision for African-Americans, selling lots for less than $100. In the 1890s, a typical Orange Mound house was a small, narrow "shotgun"-style house.  A tradition says the name comes from mock-orange trees or shrubs on the grounds of the old homeplace.

Annexation 
In 1919, The City of Memphis annexed the community.

Vibrant black community - 1970s 
In the 1970s, Orange Mound was billed as "the largest concentration of blacks in the United States except for Harlem in New York City."  The neighborhood provided a refuge for black people moving to the city for the first time from rural areas.  Although the streets of the early Orange Mound were unpaved, it was a vibrant community in which a mix of residences, businesses, churches, and cultural centers flourished.  During the era of desegregation, Orange Mound entered a period of decline as younger residents began to move away.

Drugs and crime - 1980s-1990s 
Built on strong families, preachers, churches, and civic pride, this was a huge community of black homeowners in the 1940-50's.  Drugs and alcohol had been an issue for many years. Once crack entered, the community was destroyed with violence and drug dealing.  Drug use devastated poor and middle-class families.  The community role models shifted away from teachers, preachers, and doctors to drug dealers and gang members. Orange Mound was listed in 1994 as the # 1 area for murders, burglaries, and rapes in Memphis.  Since 1994, Orange Mound has improved considerably as crime has decreased due to the revitalization of the community.

Revitalization - 2000s 
In the first decade of the 21st century, Orange Mound has been the focus of a variety of revitalization efforts.  One such effort, the Orange Mound Collaborative, funded by a Ford Foundation grant, stresses "education through empowerment."  The Orange Mound Collaborative's projects include an Early Childhood Institute, and an oral history project in which researchers conduct videotaped interviews with Orange Mound's older residents.

S.M.A.R.T. (2003) 
In 2003, Orange Mound was named one of 21 areas in Memphis that are the focus of the S.M.A.R.T. Revitalization Plan ("Servicing  the  Metropolitan  Area  through the
Redevelopment of Targeted neighborhoods"), a public-private partnership to create vibrant neighborhoods in declining areas.

Progress (2004) 
In a 2004, editorial in the Memphis Commercial Appeal, Robert Lipscomb, director of Memphis's Housing and Community Development division, wrote that much progress has been made in revitalizing Orange Mound, through a combination of code enforcement, tenant education programs, and neighborhood cleanup efforts.

2009, 2010 
In the Fall of 2009, Melrose High School opened its stadium with new state of the art technology, new field, bleachers, and park.  This was only a minor point of a changing community.  In recent years crime has gone down nearly 10%.  Alumni of the high school are taking it upon themselves to become more involved in the lives of the upcoming generation in order to ensure a brighter future.

Orange Mound Community Garden 
A group called the Mid-South Peace & Justice Center helped neighborhood residents to create the Orange Mound Community Garden.  Organizers of the garden project hope the project will help beautify the community, provide a source of nutritious food, teach leadership skills, and encourage self-reliance.

Orange Mound Tower

In 2021, plans to develop the United Equipment Building, an abandoned feed mill in Orange Mound, were announced. The proposed development is for the building to become a multi-use facility called the Orange Mound Tower. The $50 million development project is being led by Victoria Jones, a local arts organizer, and IMAKEMADBEATS, a local music producer. Jones' organization, TONE, is based in Orange Mound, and IMAKEMADBEATS grew up in Orange Mound.

Culture

Churches 
Churches in Orange Mound, and throughout Memphis, have played a critical role in developing community leaders and fostering stability.  Particularly important has been Mount Moriah Missionary Baptist Church, which has been at the corner of Carnes Avenue and David St. since 1926, and Mt Pisgah CME Church on the corner of Park Avenue and Marechalneil.  This church played a role in the Civil Rights Movement by assisting activists jailed for their activities in support of racial equality.

Music 
Orange Mound hosts a growing underground rap scene as well as national hip-hop stars.  The hit rap duo 8 Ball & MJG (Premro Smith and Marlon Jermain Goodwin) grew up in Orange Mound. They met at Ridgeway High in East Memphis where many Orange Mound children were educated from the early 1970s to the early 1990s.

Literature 
Orange Mound is the title and setting of a novel written by author Jay Fingers, who grew up in the neighborhood.  The novel was recently deemed a "Memphis Book for Summer Reading" by the Memphis Flyer.

Education 
Melrose High School, Ridgeway High and Dunbar Elementary School are located in Orange Mound and serve as a sources of pride and focal points for the community.  On Fridays during football season members of the community come together to cheer on the Golden Wildcats at Melrose Stadium.

Key to Orange Mound 
Tyler Glover, who operates Tyler's Place restaurant at 2481 Park Avenue, has been elected the "Mayor of Orange Mound," and his restaurant the official Orange Mound "city hall."  During the first term of Memphis Mayor W. W. Herenton, Glover presented Herenton with an orange "key to Orange Mound."  Glover's words convey the love that Orange Mound's long-term residents feel for Orange Mound: "This is the greatest community in the world....  It is the greatest community because I know everybody here and I love working on committees and making this a better place in which to live.  I don't want to live any other place than Orange Mound.  I have had numerous opportunities to move some place else, but there is no other place in the world I want to live, but Orange Mound, Tenn." In 2007 during Glover incompacity, Orange Mound elected Melrose Veteran and Hall of famer Jason Smith as Mayor.

Online Community Newsletter 
On October 6, 2011, a member of the Orange Mound community launched a website for former and current residents of the community, and others, to follow community events, share community-related information, and enlighten each other about the history, events, and vitality of Orange Mound.  The website address for the newsletter is https://web.archive.org/web/20161006233615/http://orangemoundunited.com/

References 

 Jones, Yolanda (Dec. 24, 2004). "Ludacris hustles back to town -- Memphis's working artists stay busy on the road, too." The Commercial Appeal (Memphis), p. G18-G19.
 Kelley, Michael (Feb. 1, 1996). "Reality with a Beat: Memphis Rappers Speak to Urban Life." The Commercial Appeal (Memphis), p. C1.
 Lipscomb, Robert (Apr. 18, 2004). "Paving the Way to Livable Neighborhoods." The Commercial Appeal (Memphis), p. B5.
 Magness, Perre (Apr. 23, 1992). "Orange Mound Holds Unique Niche." The Commercial Appeal (Memphis), p. E2.
 Perkins, Pamela (Aug. 12, 1999). "Oral History Project is Open Mike For Voices of Experience." The Commercial Appeal (Memphis), p. CC7.
 Perkins, Pamela (Nov. 14, 2003). "City Picks Needy Areas for Revitalization Plan." The Commercial Appeal (Memphis), p. C1.
 Perkins, Pamela (Oct. 31, 1998). "Orange Mound is Rekindling Its Glow." The Commercial Appeal (Memphis), p. A9.
 Unsigned Article (Oct. 8, 2003). "Pride Still Blooms Amid Faded Glory of Orange Mound." The Commercial Appeal (Memphis), p. B2.
 Risher, Wayne (Oct. 20, 1994). "Orange Mound Church Now 115." The Commercial Appeal (Memphis), p. EC1.
 Scott, Jonathan (May 29, 1998). "'Mayor' of Orange Mound Reviving Business with a Little Help from City-County Program." Memphis Business Journal.

Neighborhoods in Memphis, Tennessee
African-American history in Memphis, Tennessee